Wang Changqing (born 21 March 1981 in Beijing) is a Chinese football player.

Club career

Shaanxi Guoli
Wang Changqing originally began his football career when he played for the Beijing Hongdeng youth team, however he would move to top tier team Shaanxi Guoli during the 2002 league season to begin his professional football career. While he was playing at the top tier Wang Changqing often found Shaanxi Guoli at the bottom the league table and by the 2003 league found them relegated at the end of the league season. He stayed with them throughout the 2004 league season, however he was unable to help them in their promotion push and saw them finish in a disappointing 12th at the end of the season. The 2005 league season was to prove even more disappointing when Shaanxi Guoli went bankrupt and disbanded during the 2005 league season.

Beijing Guoan
Wang Changqing was unable to play football until the 2005 league season finished, however he was able to return home to Beijing when Beijing Guoan were willing take him into their team at the beginning of the 2006 Chinese Super League season. Able to play in the top tier once more he would make his debut on May 13, 2006 against Liaoning FC in a 1-0 win. In his first season, he often found it difficult to establish himself as a team regular within the Beijing Guoan squad and found himself often coming on as substitute in many games and this continued throughout much of the next season, nevertheless Wang Changqing has continued to be regular squad player for the team.

Shanghai Shenhua
With his contract at Beijing Guoan coming to an end Wang transferred to Guoan's rival club Shanghai Shenhua on 1 January 2013 where would go on to make his debut in the club's first game of the 2013 Chinese Super League season against Tianjin Teda F.C. in a game that ended in a 0-0 draw. As the season progressed Wang quickly established himself as versatile regular who was often used as an emergency right-back. On the few occasions he was used in attacking positions he would score his first goal for the club on 22 May 2013 in a Chinese FA Cup game against Dali Travel Ruilong that ended in a 3-2 defeat.

Beijing Enterprises
On 7 July 2015, Wang transferred to China League One side Beijing Enterprises.

Honours
Beijing Guoan
Chinese Super League: 2009

References

External links 
Player profile at Beijing Guoan website
Player stats at football-lineups website
Player stats at sohu.com 
Player profile at sodasoccer.com 

1981 births
Living people
Chinese footballers
Footballers from Beijing
Beijing Guoan F.C. players
Shanghai Shenhua F.C. players
Beijing Sport University F.C. players
Chinese Super League players
China League One players
Association football midfielders